The First and Second Avenues Line, also known as the Second Avenue Line, is a bus line in Manhattan, New York City, running mostly along Second Avenue (and northbound on First Avenue since 1951) from Lower Manhattan to East Harlem. Originally a streetcar line along Second Avenue, it is now the M15 bus route, the busiest bus route in the city and United States, carrying over 8.1 million people annually. MTA Regional Bus Operations, under the New York City Bus and Select Bus Service brands, operates the local out of the Tuskegee Airmen Bus Depot and the SBS from the Mother Clara Hale Bus Depot. Service is operated exclusively with articulated buses.

History

The Second Avenue Railroad opened the line in 1853 and 1854, from Peck Slip on the East River north along Pearl Street, Bowery (shared with the Third Avenue Line), Grand Street, Chrystie Street, and Second Avenue to East Harlem. A short branch was later built along Stuyvesant Street and Astor Place to end at Broadway in NoHo. The Metropolitan Street Railway leased the line in January 1898, and on April 3 the line from Astor Place to Manhattan was electrified. The original line was later electrified to the Bowery, where streetcars used the Third Avenue Line to City Hall, and the line to Peck Slip was abandoned.

Buses were substituted for streetcars by the East Side Omnibus Corporation on June 25, 1933. The New York City Board of Transportation took over operations in 1948, with the New York City Transit Authority (NYCTA) replacing it in 1953.

Limited-stop service began on September 13, 1976, with buses making only 15 stops, spaced every eight blocks, between 126th Street and Houston Street, saving riders up to 23 minutes. Limited-stop service ran every six minutes on weekdays, heading southbound in the morning, between 7:12 and 9:21 a.m., and northbound in the afternoon, between 4:12 and 6:11 p.m. These buses were identified by signs on the lower right side of the windshield. As part of the project, new dedicated bus lanes were installed.

On September 7, 1987, a public hearing was held to discuss the NYCTA's plan to reduce the span of weekend evening M15 service to City Hall and Park Row from ending at 12:40 a.m. to ending at 8:10 p.m.. In addition, the hours of weekday service were to be lengthened slightly. The changes were to be made to provide a more uniform service frequency and service pattern.

In June 2002 as part of an outside study, the First/Second Avenues corridor was identified for the implementation of bus rapid transit (BRT) service, due to heavy ridership and slow travel speeds on the corridor. In late 2004, the Metropolitan Transportation Authority (MTA) and the New York City Department of Transportation selected the route as one of the candidates for bus rapid transit service, along with Fordham Road (since implemented), Nostrand Avenue, Merrick Boulevard, and Hylan Boulevard. This evolved into Phase I of the Select Bus Service (SBS) program in 2006. On October 10, 2010, service began on the M15 Select Bus Service, replacing limited stop service. By then, the MTA had discontinued service to City Hall due to budget cuts. Both the M15 local and M15 SBS were previously assigned to the 126th Street Depot until January 4, 2015.

Select Bus Service stops

References

External links

 
 M15 First/Second Avenues SBS − mta.info
 First Avenue And Second Avenue Select Bus Service − NYCDOT

 02
1853 introductions
M015
015
M015